This is a list of Time Team episodes from series 9.

Episode

Series 9

Episode # refers to the air date order. The Time Team Specials are aired in between regular episodes, but are omitted from this list. Regular contributors on Time Team include: Tony Robinson (presenter); archaeologists Mick Aston, Phil Harding, Carenza Lewis, Ian Powlesland, Jenni Butterworth, Katie Hirst, Kerry Ely, Alice Roberts; Robin Bush, Guy de la Bédoyère, Dr. Peter Reynolds (historians); Victor Ambrus (illustrator); Stewart Ainsworth (landscape investigator); John Gater, Chris Gaffney (Geophysics); Henry Chapman (surveyor); Mark Corney (Roman specialist).

References

External links
Time Team at Channel4.com
The Unofficial Time Team site Fan site

Time Team (Series 09)
2002 British television seasons